The 2018 ITS Cup was a professional tennis tournament played on outdoor clay courts. It was the tenth edition of the tournament and was part of the 2018 ITF Women's Circuit. It took place in Olomouc, Czech Republic, on 16–22 July 2018.

Singles main draw entrants

Seeds 

 1 Rankings as of 2 July 2018.

Other entrants 
The following players received a wildcard into the singles main draw:
  Nikola Břečková
  Magdaléna Pantůčková
  Anastasia Pribylova
  Barbora Štefková

The following players received entry from the qualifying draw:
  Anastasia Dețiuc
  Petra Krejsová
  Maria Marfutina
  Ioana Loredana Roșca

The following player received entry as a lucky losers:
  Pia König
  Victoria Muntean

Champions

Singles

 Fiona Ferro def.  Karolína Muchová, 6–4, 6–4

Doubles

 Petra Krejsová /  Jesika Malečková def.  Lucie Hradecká /  Michaëlla Krajicek, 6–2, 6–1

External links 
 2018 ITS Cup at ITFtennis.com
 Official website

2018 ITF Women's Circuit
2018 in Czech women's sport
2018 in Czech tennis
ITS Cup